The Block is a colloquial but universally applied name given to a residential block of social housing in the suburb of Redfern, Sydney, bound by Eveleigh, Caroline, Louis and Vine Streets. Beginning in 1973, houses on this block were purchased over a period of 30 years by the Aboriginal Housing Company (AHC) for use as a project in Aboriginal-managed housing.

Location
The Block is probably the most famous feature of the suburb of Redfern, although it is located on the western border of that suburb, on the edge of Darlington. The focus of life in the Block has always been Eveleigh Street, which is its eastern border, with railway lines on the other side of that street.  The Block is in the immediate vicinity of Redfern station.

Aboriginal Housing Company
The area was significant as an affordable source of low-cost housing for disadvantaged Aboriginal people.

The Block has historically been the subject of large protests, starting in the early 1970s, when landlords in the area conducted a campaign of evicting all Aboriginal residents. A group of campaigners, led by future judge Bob Bellear and his wife Kay, successfully lobbied the Whitlam government for a grant which allowed the Aboriginal Housing Company (AHC) to commence purchasing houses in 1972. Other people involved in the early days were Bob's brother Sol Bellear; architect Colin James; Lyall Munro Jnr and his wife Jenny Munro; Gary Foley; Paul Coe and his sister Isabel Coe; Billy Craigie (later Isabel's husband); Gary Williams; Naomi Mayers; and many others. In 2017 it was reported that the core founding group comprised eight people, of whom Lyall Munro was the only one still alive.

As a pioneering and still unique project in Aboriginal-run housing near the centre of Australia's largest city, it excites enormous emotions, and moreover is viewed by the largely rural Indigenous population of New South Wales as a pied-à-terre and spiritual home in Australia's largest city. 

In 2004, the Aboriginal Housing Company decided to raze part of The Block that had deteriorated into a slum.

2004 Redfern riot

On 14 February 2004, The Block was the scene of 2004 Redfern riots following the death of an Aboriginal boy, TJ Hickey. Hickey died after, while on his bicycle, he collided with a protruding gutter, was flung into the air and was impaled on a  fence outside a block of units off Phillip Street, Waterloo, as he was fleeing police. Hickey was transported from the scene to the Sydney Children's Hospital in a critical but stable condition. He died with his family by his side on 15 February due to the severity of his wounds.

The community were upset about the death, and riots ensued. Redfern railway station was damaged by fire. The ticketing area and station master's office were significantly damaged, and the windows in the front of the station were bricked up for almost a year afterwards to prevent further attacks. They were later replaced with glass windows.

Pemulwuy Project

The AHC's plan for the redevelopment of The Block, known as The Pemulwuy Project (after the 18th-century Bidjigal warrior Pemulwuy), was met with some opposition by the state government in 2008. When demolition of The Block was announced in late 2010, London's Telegraph reported that for non-Aboriginal people, The Block had assumed a reputation for violence and crime.

The Redfern Aboriginal Tent Embassy (based on the idea of the Aboriginal Tent Embassy set up in Canberra in 1972) was set up in 2014 by Lyall Munro Jnr, his wife Jenny Munro, and other activists, to protest against the redevelopment.

In 2017, there was a meeting of around 200 people at the Redfern Community Centre, which had been called to enable the community to ask the AHC about its plans to increase the size of the development. At that time,  Alisi Tutuila was chair of the AHC, and Lani Tuitavake was general manager. Many criticised the move, and Lyall Munro (sole survivor of the original eight founders) spoke out against it. It appeared that divisions had emerged between the AHC and sections of the community since the early days. Critics say that the AHC, as a private operator, has abandoned its roots as a community organisation.
 
 the Pemulwuy Project is proceeding. Its design won an award for development excellence in 2021.

Footnotes

References

Further reading

 Foley, Gary. Black power in Redfern 1968–1972, 2001.

External links
The Block, Four Corners transcript 12/05/97
The Block: Stories from a Meeting Place SBS interactive documentary

Sydney localities
Indigenous Australian politics
Indigenous Australians in New South Wales
Redfern, New South Wales
Indigenous Australian communities